Angel Lozano is an electrical engineer at Universitat Pompeu Fabra in Barcelona, Spain. He was named a Fellow of the Institute of Electrical and Electronics Engineers (IEEE) in 2014 for his contributions to multiple-input, multiple-output antenna systems.

References

Fellow Members of the IEEE
Living people
Spanish engineers
Academic staff of Pompeu Fabra University
Year of birth missing (living people)
Place of birth missing (living people)